Gender Trouble: Feminism and the Subversion of Identity (1990; second edition 1999) is a book by the philosopher Judith Butler in which the author argues that gender is a kind of improvised performance.

Summary

Butler criticizes one of the central assumptions of feminist theory, that there exists an identity and a subject that requires representation in politics and language. For Butler, "women" and "woman" are categories complicated by factors such as class, ethnicity, and sexuality. Moreover, the universality presumed by these terms parallels the assumed universality of the patriarchy and erases the particularity of oppression in distinct times and places. Butler thus eschews identity politics in favor of a new, coalitional feminism that critiques the basis of identity and gender. They  challenge assumptions about the distinction often made between sex and gender, according to which sex is biological while gender is culturally constructed. Butler argues that this false distinction introduces a split into the supposedly unified subject of feminism. Sexed bodies cannot signify without gender, and the apparent existence of sex prior to discourse and cultural imposition is only an effect of the functioning of gender. Sex and gender are both constructed.

Examining the work of the philosophers Simone de Beauvoir and Luce Irigaray, Butler explores the relationship between power and categories of sex and gender. For de Beauvoir, women constitute a lack against which men establish their identity; for Irigaray, this dialectic belongs to a "signifying economy" that excludes the representation of women altogether because it employs phallocentric language. Both assume that there exists a female "self-identical being" in need of representation, and their arguments hide the impossibility of "being" a gender at all. Butler argues instead that gender is performative: no identity exists behind the acts that supposedly "express" gender, and these acts constitute, rather than express, the illusion of the stable gender identity. If the appearance of “being” a gender is thus an effect of culturally influenced acts, then there exists no solid, universal gender: constituted through the practice of performance, the gender "woman" (like the gender "man") remains contingent and open to interpretation and "resignification". In this way, Butler provides an opening for subversive action. They call for people to trouble the categories of gender through performance.

Discussing the patriarchy, Butler notes that feminists have frequently made recourse to the supposed pre-patriarchal state of culture as a model upon which to base a new, non-oppressive society. For this reason, accounts of the original transformation of sex into gender by means of the incest taboo have proven particularly useful to feminists. Butler revisits three of the most popular: the anthropologist Claude Lévi-Strauss's anthropological structuralism, in which the incest taboo necessitates a kinship structure governed by the exchange of women; Joan Riviere's psychoanalytic description of "womanliness as a masquerade" that hides masculine identification and therefore also conceals a desire for another woman; and Sigmund Freud's psychoanalytic explanation of mourning and melancholia, in which loss prompts the ego to incorporate attributes of the lost loved one, in which cathexis becomes identification.

Butler extends these accounts of gender identification in order to emphasize the productive or performative aspects of gender. With Lévi-Strauss, they suggest that incest is "a pervasive cultural fantasy" and that the presence of the taboo generates these desires; with Riviere, they state that mimicry and masquerade form the "essence" of gender; with Freud, they assert that "gender identification is a kind of melancholia in which the sex of the prohibited object is internalized as a prohibition" (63) and therefore that "same-sexed gender identification" depends on an unresolved (but simultaneously forgotten) homosexual cathexis (with the father, not the mother, of the Oedipal myth). For Butler, "heterosexual melancholy is culturally instituted as the price of stable gender identities" (70) and for heterosexuality to remain stable, it demands the notion of homosexuality, which remains prohibited but necessarily within the bounds of culture. Finally, they point again to the productivity of the incest taboo, a law which generates and regulates approved heterosexuality and subversive homosexuality, neither of which exists before the law.

In response to the work of the psychoanalyst Jacques Lacan that posited a paternal Symbolic order and a repression of the "feminine" required for language and culture, Julia Kristeva added women back into the narrative by claiming that poetic language—the "semiotic"—was a surfacing of the maternal body in writing, uncontrolled by the paternal logos. For Kristeva, poetic writing and maternity are the sole culturally permissible ways for women to return to the maternal body that bore them, and female homosexuality is an impossibility, a near psychosis. Butler criticizes Kristeva, claiming that her insistence on a "maternal" that precedes culture and on poetry as a return to the maternal body is essentialist: "Kristeva conceptualizes this maternal instinct as having an ontological status prior to the paternal law, but she fails to consider the way in which that very law might well be the cause of the very desire it is said to repress" (90). Butler argues the notion of "maternity" as the long-lost haven for females is a social construction, and invokes Michel Foucault's arguments in The History of Sexuality (1976) to posit that the notion that maternity precedes or defines women is itself a product of discourse.

Butler dismantles part of Foucault's critical introduction to the journals he published of Herculine Barbin, an intersex person who lived in France during the 19th century and eventually committed suicide when she was forced to live as a man by the authorities. In his introduction to the journals, Foucault writes of Barbin's early days, when she was able to live her gender or "sex" as she saw fit as a "happy limbo of nonidentity" (94). Butler accuses Foucault of romanticism, claiming that his proclamation of a blissful identity "prior" to cultural inscription contradicts his work in The History of Sexuality, in which he posits that the idea of a "real" or "true" or "originary" sexual identity is an illusion, in other words that "sex" is not the solution to the repressive system of power but part of that system itself. Butler instead places Barbin's early days not in a "happy limbo" but along a larger trajectory, always part of a larger network of social control. They suggest finally that Foucault's surprising deviation from his ideas on repression in the introduction might be a sort of "confessional moment", or vindication of Foucault's own homosexuality of which he rarely spoke and on which he permitted himself only once to be interviewed.

Butler traces the feminist theorist Monique Wittig's thinking about lesbianism as the one recourse to the constructed notion of sex. The notion of "sex" is always coded as female, according to Wittig, a way to designate the non-male through an absence. Women, thus reduced to "sex", cannot escape carrying sex as a burden. Wittig argues that even naming body parts as sexual creates a fictitious limitation of what body parts can be considered erogenous, socially constructing the features themselves and fragmenting what was really once "whole". Language, repeated over time, "produces reality-effects that are eventually misperceived as 'facts'" (115).

Butler questions the notion that "the body" itself is a natural entity that "admits no genealogy", a usual given without explanation: "How are the contours of the body clearly marked as the taken-for-granted ground or surface upon which gender signification are inscribed, a mere facticity devoid of value, prior to significance?" (129). Building on the thinking of the anthropologist Mary Douglas, outlined in her Purity and Danger (1966), Butler claims that the boundaries of the body have been drawn to instate certain taboos about limits and possibilities of exchange. Thus the hegemonic and homophobic press has read the pollution of the body that AIDS brings about as corresponding to the pollution of the homosexual's sexual activity, in particular his crossing the forbidden bodily boundary of the perineum. In other words, Butler's claim is that "the body is itself a consequence of taboos that render that body discrete by virtue of its stable boundaries" (133). Butler proposes the practice of drag as a way to destabilize the exteriority/interiority binary, finally to poke fun at the notion that there is an "original" gender, and to demonstrate playfully to the audience, through an exaggeration, that all gender is in fact scripted, rehearsed, and performed.

Butler attempts to construct a feminism (via the politics of jurido-discursive power) from which the gendered pronoun has been removed or not presumed to be a reasonable category. They claim that even the binary of subject/object, which forms the basic assumption for feminist practices—"we, 'women,' must become subjects and not objects"—is a hegemonic and artificial division. The notion of a subject is for them formed through repetition, through a "practice of signification" (144). Butler offers parody (for example, the practice of drag) as a way to destabilize and make apparent the invisible assumptions about gender identity and the inhabitability of such "ontological locales" (146) as gender. By redeploying those practices of identity and exposing as always failed the attempts to "become" one's gender, they believe that a positive, transformative politics can emerge.

All page numbers are from the first edition: Judith Butler, Gender Trouble: Feminism and the Subversion of Identity (New York, Routledge, 1990).

Publication history
Gender Trouble was first published by Routledge in 1990. Later that decade, a second edition was published by Routledge. In 2006, a Routledge Classics edition was published.

Reception
Gender Trouble was reviewed by Shane Phelan in Women & Politics. The work has enjoyed widespread popularity outside of traditional academic circles, even inspiring a fanzine, Judy! Butler, in a preface to the second edition of the book, writes that they were surprised by the size of the book's audience and its eventual status as a founding text of queer theory. Anthony Elliott writes that with the publication of Gender Trouble, Butler established themself at the forefront of feminism, women's studies, lesbian and gay studies, and queer theory. According to Elliott, the core idea expounded in Gender Trouble, that "gender is a kind of improvised performance, a form of theatricality that constitutes a sense of identity", came to be seen as "foundational to the project of queer theory and the advancing of dissident sexual practices during the 1990s."

On November 23, 2018, the playwright Jordan Tannahill read the entirety of Gender Trouble outside the Hungarian Parliament Building in protest of Hungarian Prime Minister Viktor Orbán's decision to revoke accreditation and funding for gender studies programs in the country.

See also
 Feminist philosophy
 Poststructuralism
 Third-wave feminism
 Undoing Gender

Notes

References

Further reading
 Judith Butler: Live Theory by Vicki Kirby

1990s LGBT literature
1990 non-fiction books
American non-fiction books
Books by Judith Butler
English-language books
Feminist books
Gender studies books
Intersex in non-fiction
LGBT literature in the United States
LGBT non-fiction books
Queer theory
Postmodern feminism
Routledge books